Argoed is a small village in the community of Nantmel, Powys, Wales, which is 55 miles (88 km) from Cardiff and 152 miles (244 km) from London.

The village has a water mill constructed around 1840, that stands on Nant Treflyn, which flows into the River Wye.

References

See also 
 List of localities in Wales by population

Villages in Powys